The 1996 Rugby League Divisional Premiership  was the 10th end-of-season Rugby League Divisional Premiership competition and the first in the Super League era.

The competition was contested by only four teams for the 1996 season; the top three teams in Division One, and the winners of Division Two. The winners were Salford Reds.

Semi-finals

Final

See also
 1996 RFL Division One
 1996 RFL Division Two

Notes

References
 

Rugby League Divisional Premiership